Emma Clare Thynn, Marchioness of Bath (née McQuiston; born 26 March 1986) is a British socialite and fashion model. She is married to Ceawlin Thynn, 8th Marquess of Bath. In 2020, she became the first mixed race marchioness in British history.

Early life and education 
Emma Clare McQuiston was born on 26 March 1986, in London, the daughter of a Nigerian father and an English mother. Her father, Chief Oladipo Jadesimi, is a Nigerian oil billionaire who is the executive chairman of Lagos Deep Offshore Logistics Company and is a titleholder in the Nigerian chieftaincy system, while her mother, Suzanna McQuiston, is an English socialite. She has several half-siblings, including Amy Jadesimi.

McQuiston was raised in South Kensington. She was head girl at Queen's Gate School during her secondary education and later attended University College London to study art history. After university, she studied classical acting at the London Academy of Music and Dramatic Art.

Personal life 
McQuiston and Ceawlin Thynn, Viscount Weymouth announced their engagement in November 2012, after a year of dating. They were married at Longleat, the family seat in Wiltshire, on 8 June 2013. Upon her marriage McQuiston became Viscountess Weymouth. The wedding took place in front of 355 guests, the largest ceremony held at the estate. Her wedding dress, designed by Angelina Colarusso, featured a fitted bodice, square neckline and sheer lace sleeves embroidered with a pattern of the traditional Bath flower. She wore a diamond tiara with a ribbon scroll and bow designs, estimated to be 60-70 carats. The following year, Viscountess Weymouth hosted an exhibition focusing on weddings hosted at Longleat, featuring her gown and portrait in display. 

The Marquess and Marchioness of Bath were not present at the wedding; the groom's father was engaged in a family dispute about Longleat's artwork at the time, while his mother was prohibited from attending after making racist remarks regarding their marriage. Subsequently, Emma Thynn and her family are reportedly estranged from her mother-in-law. Thynn claimed in an interview that she had been on the receiving end of "snobbishness, particularly among the much older generation. There’s class and then there’s the racial thing... I’m not super-easily offended but it’s a problem when someone’s making you feel different or separate because of your race". 

When her husband succeeded his father as the Marquess of Bath, she became the first black marchioness in British history.

The couple's first child, John Alexander Ladi Thynn, Viscount Weymouth was born in October 2014, in London by emergency caesarian section after Thynn suffered from hypophysitis. His birth took place at the Lindo Wing, St. Mary's Hospital. As a result of her health struggles during her previous pregnancy, their second child, Lord Henry Richard Isaac Thynn was born in December 2016, in Los Angeles after being carried by a surrogate.

Career 
After her marriage, she became "chatelaine" at Longleat's estate and safari park. There, she founded the food and lifestyle brand Emma's Kitchen.

Lady Bath was featured alongside her husband in All Change at Longleat, a three-part documentary filmed in 2014 and broadcast on BBC One in September 2015.

In 2017, she became a brand ambassador for Fiorucci. She also modelled for Dolce & Gabbana, walking in runway shows at Harrods. 

In February 2018, Lady Bath began working as a fashion editor at British Vogue. She is also contributing editor at HuffPost.

From September 2019, she was a contestant in the 17th season of the prime-time BBC television program, Strictly Come Dancing, partnered with professional dancer Aljaž Škorjanec. The couple was eliminated in week seven.

On 18 September 2021, she was a contestant alongside Lauren Steadman in the "Strictly" celebrities special of Pointless; her duo was the first eliminated duo of the episode.

 Score was awarded by guest judge Alfonso Ribeiro

See also
Nigerian bourgeoisie, Lady Bath's class in Nigeria
Black British nobility, Lady Bath's class in Britain

References 

1986 births
Living people
People educated at Queen's Gate School
Alumni of University College London
Alumni of the London Academy of Music and Dramatic Art
Black British women
English female models
Nigerian recipients of British titles
Bath
English socialites
Jadesimi family
Fashion influencers
Models from London
Emma
British women bloggers
English bloggers
English people of Yoruba descent
21st-century English women